Anarchism in Australia arrived within a few years of anarchism developing as a distinct tendency in the wake of the 1871 Paris Commune. Although a minor school of thought and politics, composed primarily of campaigners and intellectuals, Australian anarchism has formed a significant current throughout the history and literature of the colonies and nation. Anarchism's influence has been industrial and cultural, though its influence has waned from its high point in the early 20th century where anarchist techniques and ideas deeply influenced the official Australian union movement. In the mid 20th century anarchism's influence was primarily restricted to urban bohemian cultural movements. In the late 20th century and early 21st century Australian anarchism has been an element in Australia's social justice and protest movements.

History 
Anarchism has found both proponents and critics during the short history since British Colonial Conquest of Australia. International movements, émigrés or home-grown anarchists have all contributed to radical politics during the nation's formation.

Beginnings 
The Melbourne Anarchist Club was officially founded on 1 May 1886 by David Andrade and others breaking away from the Australasian Secular Association of Joseph Symes, the journal Honesty being the anarchist club's official organ; and anarchism became a significant minor current on the Australian left. The current included a diversity of views on economics, ranging from an individualism influenced by Benjamin Tucker to the anarchist communism of JA Andrews. All regarded themselves as broadly "socialist" however. The Anarchists mixed with the seminal literary figures Henry Lawson and Mary Gilmore and the labour journalist and utopian socialist William Lane. The most dramatic event associated with this early Australian anarchism was perhaps the bombing of the "non-union" ship SS Aramac on 27 July 1893 by Australian anarchist and union organiser Larrie Petrie. This incident occurred in the highly charged atmosphere following the defeat of the 1890 Australian maritime dispute and the 1891 Australian shearers' strike, an atmosphere which also produced the Sydney-based direct action group the "Active Service Brigade" Petrie was arrested for attempted murder but charges were dropped after a few months. He later joined Lane's "New Australia" utopian experiment in Paraguay.

A major challenge to the principles of these early Australian anarchists was the virulent anti-Chinese racism of the time, of which racism William Lane himself was a leading exponent. On a political level the anarchists opposed the anti-Chinese agitation. "The Chinese, like ourselves, are the victims of monopoly and exploitation" editorialised Honesty "We had far better set to and make our own position better instead of, like a parcel of blind babies, trying to make theirs worse." The anarchists were sometimes more ambivalent on the subject than this statement of principle might suggest; anti-Chinese racism was entrenched in the labour movement of which they were a part, and challenged by few others.

World War I 
Monty Miller, a veteran of the Eureka uprising, belonged to the Melbourne Anarchist Club. He would later become a well-known militant of the Australian branch of the Industrial Workers of the World (IWW) and was arrested and imprisoned in 1916. His friend the social activist and literary figure Willem Siebenhaar was among those who campaigned for his release.

The anarchist tradition was kept alive in Australia by, among others, the prominent agitator and street speaker Chummy Fleming who died in Melbourne in 1950 and by Italian Anarchists active in Melbourne's Matteotti Club and the North Queensland canefields. William Andrade (1863–1939), David Andrade's brother and fellow anarchist, became a successful bookseller in Sydney and Melbourne and while he retired from active politics in about 1920 he continued to influence events by allowing various radical groups to use his premises throughout the 1920s and 1930s.

Post-World War II 
After World War Two the Sydney Libertarians developed a distinct brand of "pessimistic" or "permanent protest" anarchism, deeply sceptical of revolution and of any grand scheme of human betterment, yet friendly to the revolutionary unionism of the IWW. Poet Harry Hooton associated with this group, and his friend Germaine Greer belonged to it in her youth. By 1972 she was calling herself an "anarchist communist" and was still identifying herself as "basically" an anarchist in 1999. The Sydney Libertarians were the political tendency around which the "Sydney Push" social milieu developed, a milieu which included many anarchists.

The Sydney Libertarians, along with the remnant of the Australian IWW and of Italian and Spanish migrant anarchism fed into the Anarchist revival of the sixties and seventies which Australia shared with much of the developed world. Another post-war influence that fed into modern Australian anarchism was the arrival of anarchist refugees from Bulgaria.

The last years of Australian involvement in the Vietnam war was an active period for Australian anarchists, the high-profile draft resister Michael Matteson in particular became something of a folk hero. The prolific anarchist poet Pi O began to write. The Brisbane Self-Management Group was formed in 1971, heavily influenced by the councillist writings of the Socialisme ou Barbarie group and its offshoots. The Anarchist Bookshop in Adelaide began publishing the monthly Black Growth. Anarchists active in inner-city Melbourne played a major part in creating the Fitzroy Legal Service (FLS) in 1972.

In 1974 after successfully campaigning against the 1971 South Africa rugby union tour of Australia Anti-apartheid movement activist Peter McGregor was one of several people who involved themselves in resurrecting the Sydney Anarchist Group to organise an Australian Anarchist conference in Sydney in January 1975. At the time anarchist theory was being intensely debated. A diverse Federation of Australian Anarchists (FAA) was formed at a conference in Sydney in 1975. A walkout from the second conference in Melbourne in 1976 led to the founding of the Libertarian Socialist Federation (LSF), which in turn led to the founding of Jura Books in 1977.

The end of the 1970s saw the development of a Christian anarchist Catholic Worker tendency in Brisbane, the most prominent person in the group being Ciaron O'Reilly. This tendency exploded into prominence in 1982 because of its part along with other anarchists and assorted radicals in the Brisbane free speech fights during the Queensland premiership of Joh Bjelke-Petersen. In Melbourne in 1977 the Libertarian Workers for a Self-Managed Society (LW) were formed on a theoretical platform similar to the Brisbane Self-Management Group. This Libertarian Workers group engaged very actively in propaganda, which played a major part on making possible the Australian Anarchist Centenary Celebrations of 1986. Apart from generally respectful publicity the lasting consequences of the Celebrations were the founding of the Anarchist Media Institute, its most visible member being Joseph Toscano; and the founding of an Australian section of the International Workers' Association (IWA) called the Anarcho-Syndicalist Federation (ASF). A major part of the activity of the ASF was its agitation among Melbourne's public transport workers culminating in a significant influence on the Melbourne Tram Dispute of 1990.

In 1982 the paper Rebel Worker began to be published in Sydney as the paper of the Australian IWW. It has since then been published, with varying periodicity but commonly bimonthly, as an independent anarcho-syndicalist paper, as the paper of the Anarcho-Syndicalist Federation and currently in 2019 as the paper of the Anarcho-Syndicalist Network. The main figure associated with producing it throughout this time has been Sydney anarcho-syndicalist Mark Maguire. This history has been accompanied by a good deal of controversy.

Timeline 

 1886: Melbourne Anarchist Club founded.
 1892: Andrade's Bookery is established in Melbourne, serving as an early infoshop that provides a library, coffee shop and vegetarian restaurant.
 1893: SS Aramac bombed by anarchist Larrie Petri in Brisbane.
 1901: Chummy Fleming disrupts the opening of Federal Parliament in Melbourne in protest of restrictions around free speech and the state of poverty in Australia.
 1907: First IWW clubs form in Australia.
 1900s: IWW and AMIEU organises workers' councils in the meat industry in Queensland, Victoria and South Australia.
 1916: Two IWW members are executed after being framed for the murder of a police officer in Tottenham.
 1917: The IWW is declared an unlawful organisation by the government and more than 100 of its members are arrested.
 1934: Anarchists lead a strike among Italian immigrant sugarcane workers in north Queenslands.
 1942: Anarchist immigrant from Italy Francesco Fantin is murdered in an internment camp in South Australia by fascist Giovanni ‘Bruno’ Casotti.
 1948: The Southern Advocate for Workers Councils is published in Melbourne, advocating for libertarian socialist and council communist perspectives until 1949.
 1940s: The left-libertarian Sydney Push is formed, a collection of people who meet in pubs and discuss political theory and philosophy, with some anarchist.
 1966: The Australian New Zealand Anarchist Conference (ANZAC) is held in Sydney.
 1971: Anarchists begin to aid the green bans in Sydney.
 1971: Anarchist Julian Ripley is allegedly framed by police for bombing the Labour and National Service building.
 1977: Libertarian Workers for a Self-Managed Society founded in Melbourne.
 1977: Jura Books founded in Sydney.
 1982: A split occurs in Jura Books, with some members forming a new bookshop dubbed "Black Rose".
 1982: The Melbourne Anarchist Centre is created in Collingwood, Melbourne.
 1982: Anarchists break into Pine Gap and spraypaint "No To This Madness" and the circle-A as the base of a radar dome.
 1985: An anarchist, two communists and a social democrat break into Pine Gap and prevent a Galaxy C-5 plane from landing on schedule. They are then chased and subdued by local police, base security and CIA officers.
 1986: The Australian Anarchist Centenary Celebrations are held in Melbourne.
 1986: The Anarcho-Syndicalist Federation is founded.
 1990: Anarcho-syndicalists lead a strike among Melbourne tramworkers that results in trams blocking traffic in the city and workers taking over tram depots with community support. However, the strike fails.
 1996: A new anarchist bookshop opened in Brunswick, Melbourne suffers several attacks from neo-nazis.
 1998: Anarchists are activ in the moment to stop uranium mining on aboriginal land at the Jabiluka Blockade.
 1999: An anarcho-syndicalist conference is held in Carlton, Melbourne with international attendance from the UK, New Zealand, Japan and Korea.
 2003: Mutiny Collective formed in Sydney over anger at the Iraq War and an interest in anti-war direct action.
 2008: Mutiny Collective was one of several antiwar grousp planning to protest a military arms fair in Adelaide. The fair was canceled as a result. Labor premier Kevin Foley accused all the intending protestors of being "these feral anarchists" and that "These are feral, low-life people who want society to be in a state of near anarchy for their perverse pleasure,"
 2016: Left Renewal is founded, serving as a libertarian socialist faction of the NSW Greens.
 2019: The Melbourne Anarchist Club clubhouse is shut down after factional fighting.

See also 
 Socialism in Australia
 Angry Penguins
 How to Make Trouble and Influence People
 Mutiny Collective

References

External links 
 Bibliography of Anarchism & Syndicalism in Australia & Aotearoa / New Zealand
 Sydney Libertarians and Anarchism Index
 Anarcho-Syndicalism in Melbourne and Sydney
 anarchist bulletin
 Melbourne Anarchist Club
 Jura Books
 Rebel Worker
 Black Rose Anarchist Library and Bookshop
 Mutiny Zine: A Paper of Anarchistic Ideas and Action
 Brisbane Solidarity Network
 Black Swan Adelaide

 
Political movements in Australia
Australia